The Belgium women's national under-20 basketball team is a national basketball team of Belgium, administered by the Basketball Belgium. It represents the country in women's international under-20 basketball competitions.

FIBA U20 Women's European Championship participations

FIBA Under-21 World Championship for Women participations

See also
Belgium women's national basketball team
Belgium women's national under-19 basketball team

References

External links
Archived records of Belgium team participations

National youth sports teams of Belgium
Women's national under-20 basketball teams